Campus at Kuttanad was established in 1999 under the aegis of the University. It is situated in a serene and beautiful 42-acre campus in Pulincunnoo, Kannady, Kuttanad, the rice bowl of Kerala in Alappuzha district. It offers B.Tech programs in Civil Engineering, Computer Science & Engineering, Electrical & Electronics Engineering, Electronics and Communication Engineering, Information Technology, Mechanical Engineering and M.C.A. Many of the faculty members have refined and sharpened their knowledge through rigorous research activities and published their findings in various national and international science and technical journals. The University raised the status of college to that of a Research Center in 2017. There are 42 Research Scholars working for their PhD under nine research supervisors in the College. The faculty under which the PhD programs are offered are Faculty of Engineering, Faculty of Technology and Faculty of Social Sciences under the Cochin University of Science and Technology.

The college is situated on the outskirts of Pulincunnu Panchayat, near the village of Kannady. The college attracts students from all parts of India, particularly from Kerala, Uttar Pradesh, Bihar, West Bengal, Jharkhand and Delhi.

Admission

Admissions are based on an All India Entrance Examination known as Common Admission Test (CAT) conducted by the University which includes papers for admission to undergraduate courses. The College has got students from all over the country.

Principals
 Prof. James Kattady (Special Officer) 1999 - 2004
 Dr. M I Thampan (2004–2007)
 Dr. Preetha Mathew (2007)
 Prof. Oommen Samuel (2007–2009)
 Dr. P A Job (2009)
 Dr. Joseph Kutty   Jacob (2010-2012)
 Dr. Mathew Cheriyan (2012–2015)
 Dr. Sreejith P S (2015–2017)
 Dr. P A Job (2017)
 Dr.Sunilkumar N (2017-2020)
 Dr. Joseph Kutty   Jacob (2020–present)

Courses
 B.Tech. Mechanical Engineering: annual intake 45 seats
 B.Tech. Civil Engineering: annual intake 45 seats 
 B.Tech. Electrical and Electronics Engineering: annual intake 45 seats
 B.Tech. Electronics and Communications Engineering: annual intake 45 seats
 B.Tech. Computer Science and Engineering: annual intake 45 seats
 B.Tech. Information Technology: annual intake 45 seats
 Master of Computer Applications: annual intake 45 seats

References

External links 
Cochin University of Science and Technology 
www.cucek.in 
Facebook group

Engineering colleges in Kerala
Universities and colleges in Alappuzha district
Educational institutions established in 1999
1999 establishments in Kerala